The Portland Loggers were a professional American football team based in Portland, Oregon. They were members of the Continental Football League and only lasted one year. Featuring much of the roster of the defunct Orange County Ramblers, the team was originally known as the Hawaii Warriors, but were relocated from Honolulu to Portland just 18 days before the start of the 1969 season. The team played at Multnomah Stadium in the Goose Hollow neighborhood of Portland. They were coached by retired running back Chuck Fenenbock and their general manager was Al King.

To boost attendance towards the end of the season, team owners held several promotions at one game, including their November 16 game against the Spokane Shockers where it was "Ladies Night", "Boy Scout Night", "Chamber of Commerce Night" and "Picture Night". In October the team stopped holding their practices at Multnomah Stadium and started using the football field at Central Catholic High School. In late October the Loggers received placekicker Momčilo Gavrić on loan from the National Football League (NFL) San Francisco 49ers. Manch Wheeler, who played four games for the Buffalo Bills of the American Football League, was a quarterback on the team. Ultimately, only 25,157 fans attended the Loggers' six home games, or 4,192 per contest.

The Loggers were mentioned as a team that could have potentially played in a 1970 iteration of the Continental Football League, one that would have been based only in the western United States. The team was shut down in April 1970.

See also
Portland Rockets
Portland Thunderbirds
Portland Storm
Portland Thunder

References

Continental Football League teams
Defunct American football teams in Oregon
Loggers
Loggers
American football teams established in 1969
American football teams disestablished in 1969
1969 establishments in Oregon
1969 disestablishments in Oregon